Ali Hassanein (13 January 1939 – 12 August 2015) was an Egyptian actor.

About this life
Action in 1954. the actor work between film, theater and television roles and months of "aam Zeyiryab" in the film ice cream singer Amr Diab, and the sheikh zaryr and Kit Kat in the film of the artist Mahmoud Abdel Aziz.

Films
 Kharaga Wa lam Yaaoud
 Kit Kat
 Badal Faqed
 Our Blessed Aunt

Death
Hassanein died aged 76 from liver cancer on 12 August 2015.

See also

List of Egyptians

Notes

External links
 

1939 births
2015 deaths
Egyptian male film actors
20th-century Egyptian male actors
Deaths from liver cancer
Deaths from cancer in Egypt
Egyptian male television actors
People from Alexandria